Iolanda (minor planet designation: 509 Iolanda) is a minor planet orbiting the Sun.

References

External links
 Lightcurve plot of (509) Iolanda, Antelope Hills Observatory
 Data and Model of Iolanda at Database of Asteroid Models from Inversion Techniques
 
 

Background asteroids
Iolanda
Iolanda
S-type asteroids (Tholen)
S-type asteroids (SMASS)
19030428